Experiments in Expectation  was the final full-length release album by Seattle-based band Kill Sadie. It was released on Dim Mak Records in 2000.

Track listing 
 "The Ivy League Donor (Prescription Epidemic)" - 6:21
 "The Laugh Track for Contemporary Music" - 2:46
 "Rebirth Through Adaptation" - 2:07
 "Erf (The Place You Live)" - 4:49
 "The Quieting/Function of Mouth" - 3:50
 "The Surgeon's Muse" - 3:31
 "Untitled Number Three Hundred and Three" - 2:07
 "The Cocktail Party Effect" - 3:35
 "A Ride in the Contrifuge" - 3:38
 "An Antiquated Bluff" - 8:33

References

2001 albums
Kill Sadie albums